The New Zealand women's national cricket team toured Australia in January 1993. They played against Australia in three One Day Internationals, which were to contest the Rose Bowl. Australia won the series 2–1.

Squads

WODI Series

1st ODI

2nd ODI

3rd ODI

References

External links
New Zealand Women tour of Australia 1992/93 from Cricinfo

Women's international cricket tours of Australia
1993 in Australian cricket
New Zealand women's national cricket team tours